Milijana Maganjić, married Evtoukhovich, (born 21 February 1981 in Livno, SFR Yugoslavia) is a Croatian female basketball player.

References

External links
Profile at fibaeurope.com

1981 births
Living people
Sportspeople from Livno
Croats of Bosnia and Herzegovina
Croatian women's basketball players
Centers (basketball)